Hucklesby is a surname. Notable people with the name include:

 Anthea Hucklesby (born 1966), professor of criminal justice at the University of Leeds
 Asher Hucklesby (1844–1908), five times mayor of Luton, Bedfordshire, between 1892 and 1906